The mathematical constant  can be represented in a variety of ways as a real number.  Since  is an irrational number (see proof that e is irrational), it cannot be represented as the quotient of two integers, but it can be represented as a continued fraction.  Using calculus,  may also be represented as an infinite series, infinite product, or other types of limit of a sequence.

As a continued fraction

Euler proved that the number  is represented as the infinite simple continued fraction :

Its convergence can be tripled by allowing just one fractional number:

The second is generated from the first by a simple equivalence transformation.

This last, equivalent to [1; 0.5, 12, 5, 28, 9, ...], is a special case of a general formula for the exponential function:

As an infinite series
The number  can be expressed as the sum of the following infinite series:

 for any real number x.

In the special case where x = 1 or −1, we have:

, and

Other series include the following:

 

 where  is the th Bell number.

Consideration of how to put upper bounds on e leads to this descending series:

which gives at least one correct (or rounded up) digit per term. That is, if 1 ≤ n, then

More generally, if x is not in {2, 3, 4, 5, ...}, then

As an infinite product
The number  is also given by several infinite product forms including Pippenger's product

and Guillera's product 

where the nth factor is the nth root of the product

as well as the infinite product

More generally, if 1 < B < e2 (which includes B = 2, 3, 4, 5, 6, or 7), then

As the limit of a sequence
The number  is equal to the limit of several infinite sequences:

 and

 (both by Stirling's formula).

The symmetric limit,

The next two definitions are direct corollaries of the prime number theorem

where  is the prime-counting function.

Also:

In the special case that , the result is the famous statement:

In trigonometry
Trigonometrically,  can be written in terms of the sum of two hyperbolic functions,

 

See also
 List of formulae involving π

Notes

Exponentials
Logarithms
E (mathematical constant)